Summit View Cemetery is a historic pioneer cemetery located in Ottawa, Illinois. Summit View Cemetery was established in 1828, and was known as the South Ottawa Cemetery until 1894.

References
 Summit View Cemetery
 Summit View Cemetery Association's Board of Director's meeting minutes and burial records. 
 Information provided for this site by Gerry Thompson, Summit View Cemetery Association Board Member.

External links
 

Cemeteries in Illinois
Buildings and structures in LaSalle County, Illinois
Ottawa, Illinois